This is a list of number-one dance hits as recorded by Billboard magazine's Dance Club Songs chart – a weekly national survey of popular songs in U.S. dance clubs. It began on October 26, 1974, under the title Disco Action chart. It is compiled by Billboard exclusively from playlists submitted by nightclub disc jockeys, who must apply and meet certain criteria to become "Billboard-reporting DJs".

Below are links to lists showing the songs that have topped the chart.  Dates shown represent "week-ending" Billboard issue dates.

Billboard has adopted former publication rival Record World'''s chart statistics from the weeks between March 29, 1975, and August 21, 1976, into their Hot Dance Club Play chart history, as Billboard did not publish a national chart during this time (Billboard published multiple charts featuring regional- or city-specific hits during this era).

From the chart's inception until the week of February 16, 1991, several (or even all) songs on an EP or album could occupy the same position if more than one track from a release was receiving significant play in clubs.  Beginning with the February 23, 1991, issue, Hot Dance Club Play became "song specific", meaning that only one song could occupy each position at a time.

On January 19, 1985, the Hot Dance/Disco chart was split into two: Club Play and Dance Singles Sales, which ranked 12-inch single (or maxi-single) sales.  Those singles that reached number one each week on the sales chart are listed to the right of the number on the Club Play chart.

Below on the template are links to lists showing the songs that have topped the chart.  Dates shown represent "week-ending" Billboard'' issue dates.

See also
List of artists who reached number one on the U.S. Dance Club Songs chart
Artists with the most number-ones on the U.S. Dance Club Songs chart

External links
Current Billboard Dance Club Songs chart